Words of the Prophets is the first EP from Canadian heavy metal band Kobra and the Lotus.  It was released on August 28, 2015 via Titan Music, and was produced by Johnny K.

Background 
The album consists of cover songs, as a tribute to the Canadian bands that the members of Kobra and the Lotus grew up listening to.  On 23 June 2015, a music video for "Black Velvet" (originally recorded by Alannah Myles) was premiered via Revolver Magazine.

Track listing

Personnel 
Kobra Paige - lead vocals
Jason Kulakowski - lead/rhythm guitars
Brad Kennedy - bass

Additional personnel
Elias Bones - drums

References

External links 

Kobra and the Lotus albums
2015 EPs